Across the Wide Missouri is a 1951 American Technicolor Western film based on historian Bernard DeVoto's eponymous 1947 book. The film dramatizes an account of several fur traders and their interaction with the Native Americans.

Directed by William A. Wellman, the film stars Clark Gable as cunning trapper Flint Mitchell, Ricardo Montalbán as Blackfoot Iron Shirt, John Hodiak as Brecan, María Elena Marqués as Kamiah, a Blackfoot chief's daughter Mitchell marries and later falls in love with, J. Carrol Naish as Nez Perce Looking Glass, and Adolphe Menjou as Pierre. Howard Keel, as Mitchell's son "Chip Mitchell", narrates.

Plot
 
In the 1830s in the Rocky Mountains, fur trapper Flint Mitchell meets at the summer "rendezvous" with other mountain men, cashing in his furs, drinking, and enjoying contests among his friends. He organizes a hunting "brigade" into the beaver-rich Blackfoot territory, buying horses and recruiting trappers, despite protests from his Scottish friend and former trading partner, Brecan, who lives among the Blackfoot and warns him that the land belongs to them. Flint outbids Brecan for Kamiah, the granddaughter of Blackfoot medicine man Bear Ghost and adopted daughter of a Nez Perce chief, Looking Glass. Brecan wants to return her to the Blackfoot, to promote peace between the tribes, while Flint wants to marry Kamiah and ensure the brigade's safety.

Pierre, a French Canadian trapper, and Captain Humberstone Lyon, another Scotsman, who fought in the Battle of Waterloo, join Flint on the dangerous expedition. Kamiah successfully guides Flint and his men on their trek through the high passes filled with crippling snow drifts, and delivers them to the Blackfoot territory, where they build a stockade. Flint narrowly escapes capture and death at the hands of Ironshirt, a young Blackfoot prince and war chief, who kills Baptiste DuNord, one of Flint's best trappers. Ironshirt steals the brigade's horses, but Flint impresses Bear Ghost, who orders them returned.

Though he marries Kamiah for reasons other than love and cannot speak her language, Flint falls in love with her. As Flint and Kamiah grow closer, Flint and Bear Ghost become good friends. Bear Ghost prevents Ironshirt from harming Flint and his men, but catastrophe strikes when Roy DuNord, another of Flint's men, kills Bear Ghost to avenge his brother's death. Although Brecan kills Roy, and Flint sinks into a grieving depression over the death of Bear Ghost, Ironshirt succeeds Bear Ghost as chief and resumes his campaign to drive the white trappers out of his country.

In the spring, Kamiah gives birth to a boy, Chip. On the way to the rendezvous, the brigade is attacked by a large war party under Ironshirt, and Kamiah is killed. With Chip strapped to its back, Kamiah's horse bolts during the attack and is chased by Ironshirt, who is intent on killing the boy. Flint manages to kill Ironshirt, however, and rescue his son. As the years pass, Flint takes Chip to live in the Blackfoot camp, where, Flint believes, Kamiah would have wanted him. Although Flint intends to have the boy formally educated in the East, Chip persuades him year after year to postpone his schooling, and he learns the ways of the mountains from his father.

Cast

Production
During filming, Ricardo Montalbán was reportedly thrown off a horse, knocked out, and walked on by another horse, leaving him with a spinal injury. This injury recurred in 1993 and forced him into a wheelchair.

The film was shot largely in the Rocky Mountains, mostly at altitudes between 9,000 and 14,000 feet, north of Durango, Colorado near Purgatory and Molas Pass, the main location sites.

Music
The score for the film was composed and conducted by David Raksin, and incorporated the song "Oh Shenandoah" in its main title and end title. Additional music was composed and/or adapted (from Raksin's material) by Al Sendrey, and conducted by Johnny Green.

 Across The Wide Missouri, words and music by Ervin Drake and Jimmy Shirl
 Skip to My Lou
 Alouette, Pretty Alouette traditionals
 Indian Lullaby, words and music by Alberto Colombo, Indian lyrics by Nipo T. Strongheart

The complete score was issued on CD in 2009, on Film Score Monthly records.

Reception
According to MGM records, the film earned $2,789,000 in the US and Canada and $1,812,000 elsewhere, resulting in a profit of $635,000.

See also
Across the Wide Missouri (disambiguation)

References

External links
 
 
 
 

1951 films
American Western (genre) films
1950s English-language films
1951 Western (genre) films
Films based on non-fiction books
Films directed by William A. Wellman
Films scored by David Raksin
Films shot in Colorado
Films set in Montana
Films set in the 1820s
Films set in the 1830s
Metro-Goldwyn-Mayer films
1950s American films